Wilfrido Blanco Mora is a Costa Rican educator, civil servant, and political activist. Blanco served as Vice-Minister of Education during Abel Pacheco's presidency. During his time in office, he promoted student security, greater access to education, and higher student achievement. Under Blanco's administration, the Ministry of Public Education began requiring teaching candidates to present a criminal record with applications for teaching positions.

He was a former member of the Partido Unidad Social Cristiana (PUSC for its Spanish initials) and a current member of the Citizens' Action Party (PAC for its Spanish initials).

References

Living people
Citizens' Action Party (Costa Rica) politicians
Government ministers of Costa Rica
Year of birth missing (living people)